Laurie Blakeman (born May 23, 1958) is a Canadian politician, who represented the electoral district of Edmonton-Centre in the Legislative Assembly of Alberta. She is a member of the Alberta Liberal Party, and was first elected in the 1997 election.

In 2017, she was appointed as a member of the Veterans Review and Appeal Board for a five-year term.

Early life

She graduated with a bachelor's degree in fine arts in acting and a certificate in public administration from the University of Alberta.  Before entering politics, she worked for the Alberta Advisory Council on Women's Issues, the Phoenix Theatre and Theatre Network, the Medical Council of Canada, and the Alberta Snowmobile Association.

Political career

Electoral record

Blakeman first sought political office in the 1997 provincial election, when she ran as a Liberal candidate in Edmonton-Centre to replace retiring Liberal MLA Michael Henry.  She was elected, finishing more than a thousand votes ahead of the second-place finisher, Progressive Conservative Don Weideman.  This gap narrowed when Weideman challenged her re-election bid in the 2001 election, but grew to more than three thousand votes in 2004.  The 2008 election would bring a new Progressive Conservative Opponent, in Bill Donahue, but a similar result, as Blakeman handily retained her seat.
For the 2015 election, Blakeman ran for three political parties, Liberal, Alberta Party and Greens. 
All to no avail as she lost her seat in the legislature in the 2015 election which saw the NDP sweep to power for the first time.

Legislative initiatives

In 1997, Blakeman sponsored the Domestic Abuse Act, a private member's bill that never reached second reading.  In 1998, she brought forward the Human Rights, Citizenship and Multiculturalism Amendment Act, another private member's bill, which would have expanded the province's anti-discrimination legislation to include sexual orientation as a basis on which discrimination was prohibited (later the same year, the Supreme Court of Canada, in Vriend v. Alberta, ruled Alberta's failure to include this to be in contravention of the Charter of Rights and Freedoms); it too failed to advance to second reading.

In 1999, Blakeman sponsored the Consumers Insurance Company Act, a private bill designed to create a new insurance company, in compliance with the law that new insurance companies could only be created by acts of the legislature.  However, the bill faced some opposition from Blakeman's Liberal colleagues, including Linda Sloan, Hugh MacDonald, and Gary Dickson, who expressed concern that the bill might be a step towards privatized medicine.  The bill passed.

In 2007, Blakeman sponsored the Healthy Futures Act, which would have required major policy and funding decisions to undergo "health impact assessments", which would look at their impacts on Albertans' health through social and environmental impacts.  Blakeman's Liberal colleagues supported the bill, as did the New Democrats (although NDP MLA Ray Martin expressed concern that the bill only required assessment, rather than action, on potential adverse health impacts) and several Progressive Conservatives.  Even so, it was defeated through majority opposition of the Progressive Conservatives, many of whom expressed the view that the bill would add nothing meaningful that did not already exist under the existing regulatory framework, while, in the words of PC MLA Dave Rodney, "effectively bring[ing] the decision-
making apparatus of the government and this Assembly to a grinding halt."

Leadership aspirations

After Kevin Taft announced his intention to resign the leadership of the Alberta Liberal Party following its defeat in the 2008 election, Blakeman was one of four MLAs to express interest in running in the ensuing election to replace him.  However, in August she announced that she would not do so, citing the cost of a candidacy. She was a candidate in the 2011 leadership election, placing third.

Critic portfolios
 Liberal Opposition House Leader
 Critic for Environment and Sustainable Resource Development
 Critic for Culture
 Critic for Justice and Solicitor General
 Critic for Municipal Affairs

Personal life

Blakeman is married to Edmonton city councillor Ben Henderson.

Election results

References

1958 births
Alberta Liberal Party MLAs
Living people
Politicians from Edmonton
University of Alberta alumni
Women MLAs in Alberta
21st-century Canadian politicians
21st-century Canadian women politicians